Marino Cattedra (born 15 February 1965) is an Italian judoka. He competed at the 1988 Summer Olympics and the 1992 Summer Olympics.

References

External links
 

1965 births
Living people
Italian male judoka
Olympic judoka of Italy
Judoka at the 1988 Summer Olympics
Judoka at the 1992 Summer Olympics
Sportspeople from the Metropolitan City of Bari
Mediterranean Games bronze medalists for Italy
Mediterranean Games medalists in judo
Competitors at the 1993 Mediterranean Games
20th-century Italian people
21st-century Italian people